Kennedy Mong'are Okong'o (born 1 March 1969) is the first and immediate former Senator of Nyamira County, Kenya. He was elected Senator of Nyamira County under Ford Kenya which was part of the CORD Alliance. He won the Nyamira seat by 49,615 votes

Mung'are Okong'o is the 7th born to the late Peter Okong'o Omenge and Bethsheba Okong'o.

Education

He is an A-levels graduate of Sameta high school from where he worked as a corresponding reporter for The Standard and the Kenya Times. Mong'are joined Devi Ahilya VishwaVidalaya University, Indore, India where he studied Bachelor of Arts in Political Science, Philosophy and Psychology (1991-1994). He proceeded for a postgraduate degree in Bachelor of Legal laws and a post graduate diploma in journalism and mass communication while working as a correspondent for the Indore Times, an English Indian newspaper.

Career

Mong'are returned to Kenya and joined the Kenya school of law in 2000-2001 cluster. He later contested for the West Mugirango parliamentary seat in 2002 on a Kenya Republican Reformation party ticket and lost to the then incumbent Henry Onyancha Obwocha. He run again for the same seat in 2007 and lost to Dr. James Gesami. 
He supported the Constitutional Referendum in 2010 and subsequently won the senatorial seat in 2013 under a FORD Kenya ticket.

Individual Social Responsibility

In 2001 he Founded Elite sports management International (For Nurturing, sponsoring and managing athletes). 
In 2002 he founded Carewell society that provided medical aid and the paying of school fees for the needy. 
He also founded the Mong'are Bwo-kong'o foundation in 2010 to aid in donation of books and provide fees stipends. The foundation was heavily involved in civic education for the new Constitution.
Forum for Children rights in Kenya was founded in 2014 by Mong'are to fight for child rights. 
In 2014 Mong'are founded Bogichora Women Football club which was later converted to Nyamira County starlets which has graduated to the National Women's league.

Leadership

Kennedy Mong'are served as chairman of the Kenya African Students association (KASA) during his 3rd year of Law (1997). He founded the Kenya Law Students Association-Indian Chapter and became its president. 
In 2002, he became the secretary General of the Kenya Republican Reform party (KRRP). 
In 2005, he became the organizing secretary of NARC Kenya which was headed by Charity Ngilu. 
Mong'are Okong'o has exercised leadership through his membership of various committees in the senate. He currently serves in the Senate Education committee (since 2013), the senate Public Accounts and Investments Committee (since 2013) and the Joint Committee of Broadcasting and Library. 
Hon. Okong'o has also played a big role in the defense of devolution and is an active member of the Bunge athletic club.

Family

Kennedy Mong'are Onkong'o is a father and a husband to Dr. Devi Basanti Mong'are.

References

Members of the Senate of Kenya
1969 births
Living people